Superman: Shadow of Apokolips is a video game that was released in 2002 for the PlayStation 2 and GameCube consoles. It was developed by Infogrames Sheffield House, published by Infogrames under the Atari brand name, and released in conjunction with Warner Bros. Interactive Entertainment and DC Comics. It is based on the television series Superman: The Animated Series.

Plot
Believing Intergang to be starting up again, Superman learns that beings causing chaos throughout Metropolis are, in fact, a group of robots using Intergang's old methods. These "Interbots" have access to very high-grade weaponry, which is powerful enough to seriously injure or even kill the Man of Steel. These bots are being ordered by a leader that is later revealed to be Lex Luthor, who is secretly working with Darkseid.

Finding that the weapons come from Apokolips, Superman sets out to destroy the bots, and their weapons, having to fight a multitude of enemies that Luthor sends after him. Parasite, Metallo, and Livewire contracted to kill Superman to allow the bots free rein to obey Luthor's wishes.

Design
The game featured designs reflecting the look and feel of Superman: The Animated Series. The story was advanced by a series of cut scenes that were created using cel-shaded animation in order to further emulate the look of traditional animation. The original Animated Series voice cast all returned to their roles for the game, featuring Tim Daly as Clark Kent/Superman, Dana Delany as Lois Lane, Lori Petty as Livewire, Malcolm McDowell as Metallo, Peri Gilpin as Volcana, Michael York as Kanto, and Clancy Brown as Lex Luthor. Darkseid and Parasite from the series also appeared; however, they were not played by Michael Ironside and the late Brion James respectively, but instead by Kevin Michael Richardson and Brian George (George had taken over as Parasite's voice in Justice League).

Development and Release
On 8 September 2000, it was announced that Infogrames had picked up the license to publish and develop Superman video games from Titus Interactive under a new deal with Warner Bros. Interactive Entertainment.

At E3 2002, Infogrames announced Shadow of Apokolips as a PlayStation 2 title, based on Superman: The Animated Series, alongside its unrelated Xbox companion game Superman: The Man of Steel, which was based on the comic books.

Infogrames announced a GameCube port of the game was announced in February 2003, and it was released the following month. The GameCube version, also handled by Infogrames Sheffield House, includes many additional features and improvements over the PlayStation 2 version, featuring three selectable difficulty settings, Widescreen, Progressive Scan and Dolby Pro Logic II support, additions of secret items in every level where cheat codes can be unlocked, a free-roaming mode where the player can explore Metropolis at their own free will, enhanced boss AI, and a "Making of" movie featuring the game's development and beta elements.

Reception

The game received average to positive reviews, with an air of uncertainty going into its release because of the failure of the 1999 Superman video game, also based on the animated show. GameSpot praised the game's presentation, saying "...the Man of Steel has never looked or moved better", while panning the mechanics behind the game, saying: "He's faster than a speeding bullet, able to leap tall buildings in a single bound, and can be trapped in walls because of poor collision detection: He's Superman!" IGN felt it was the superior title to the Xbox counterpart, Superman: The Man of Steel, but calling it an "average superhero game." Entertainment Weekly, however, gave the game a C− and stated, "What keeps the game from taking off is the overly simplistic episodic nature of the missions set before you...The wacky control configuration also makes your heat vision, ice breath, X-ray vision, and superspeed incredibly difficult to use on the fly."

GameRankings gave the game a score of 65.46% for the PlayStation 2 version and 64.37% for the GameCube version, while Metacritic gave it a score of 64 out of 100 for the PS2 version and 66 out of 100 for the GameCube version.

References

External links
 

2002 video games
PlayStation 2 games
GameCube games
Atari games
Infogrames games
Action-adventure games
Video games with cel-shaded animation
Shadow of Apokolips
Shadow of Apokolips
Video games developed in the United Kingdom
Superhero video games
Video games set in the United States
Single-player video games